1600 Smith Street (previously named Continental Center I and also known as Cullen Center Plaza) is a 51-story,  office tower in Downtown Houston, Texas, United States. It served as the headquarters of Continental Airlines prior to its merger with United Airlines, and at one point also served as the headquarters of ExpressJet Airlines. It is a part of the Cullen Center complex.

The design architect was Morris Architects, the general contractor was Linbeck Construction Company, the mechanical engineer was I.A. Naman, and the structural engineer was CBM Engineers. The building was completed in 1984.

The tower stands as a postmodern-style building.  It is currently the 9th-tallest building in Houston.

History
Bruce Nichols of The Dallas Morning News said that in early 1984 1600 Smith Street "was so vacant it became a symbol for overexpansion in Houston". By 1987 the Canadian company Trizec Group bought debentures carrying an option to buy portions of the Cullen Center, including 1600 Smith Street. In 1997 subcommittees of the University of Houston System Board of Regents held meetings at 1600 Smith Street.

In September 1997, Continental Airlines announced that it would consolidate its Houston headquarters in what would become Continental Center I. The airline scheduled to move around 3,200 employees in stages beginning in July 1998 and ending in January 1999. The airline consolidated the headquarters operation at the America Tower in Neartown and three other local operations into Continental Center I and Continental Center II in the Cullen Center. Continental anticipated taking 15 floors at Continental Center I. In addition it planned to add a company store, a credit union, and an employee service center in the street-level lobby of Continental Center I. The airline agreed to lease  of space in the Cullen Center for 11 years initially and 20 years if it takes renewal options.

To make room for the airline and to increase the complex's overall tenancy, Trizec negotiated with the Shell Oil Company to renew a lease of  that was scheduled to expire in 1998. Shell had planned to downsize, so it renewed its lease for a smaller amount of space. This made additional room for Continental Airlines.

Tim Reylea, the vice president of Cushman Realty Corp., said that the Continental move "is probably the largest corporate relocation in the central business district of Houston ever". Bob Lanier, Mayor of Houston, said that he was "tickled to death" by the airline's move to relocate to Downtown Houston.
In September 2000 an electrical component burned out at Continental Center I, and the Houston Fire Department shut off the backup power supply as a precaution. As a result of the temporary power outage, delays of between 300 and 400 Continental Airlines flights occurred worldwide. The Texas bureau of Jesse Jackson's Wall Street Project opened in office space in Continental Center I in May 2001. After the September 11 attacks and by September 2004 Continental laid off 24% of its clerical and management workers. Despite the reduction of the workforce, Continental did not announce any plans to sublease any of its space in Continental Center I and Continental Center II.

In 2004 three new lease agreements to occupy space in Continental Center I were signed. Nancy Sarnoff of the Houston Business Journal said that the three to five year terms were "considerably short" for leasing agreements; she added that the short leases were due to an abundance of capacity in the Downtown office market, which allowed tenants to have more say in their agreements. Southwest Bank of Texas (now Amegy Bank) agreed to occupy . Tana Exploration Co. LLC agreed to occupy . Stinnett Thiebaud & Remington LLP agreed to occupy .

The lease deal filled the building to full occupancy and removed a large portion of available space from the Downtown Houston submarket. Tim Relyea, the vice chairperson of Cushman & Wakefield of Texas Inc., said that Chevron considered other properties before deciding on Continental Center I. He did not state which other towers the company had considered. Chevron planned to place 1,300 employees in 20 floors in the building. The company planned to begin moving employees into the tower by the third quarter of 2006. Prior to the signing of the lease agreement, rumors stated that the company was looking for more office space in Downtown Houston.

Steven Biegel, the senior vice president of Studley Inc. and a representative of office building tenants, said that the square footage renewed by Continental is a significant amount of space. Biegel added that if the space went vacant, the vacancy would not have had a significant impact in the Downtown Houston submarket as there is not an abundance of available space, and that another potential tenant would likely occupy it. Jennifer Dawson of the Houston Business Journal said that if Continental Airlines left Continental Center I, the development of Brookfield Properties's new office tower would have been delayed. The parties did not reveal the terms of the lease agreement. As of 2008, Continental Center I was 98% leased.

In 2010, Continental Airlines and United Airlines announced that they would merge and that the headquarters of the combined company would be in the Chicago Loop in Chicago. As of 2010 Continental had around 3,000 clerical and management workers in its Downtown Houston offices and leased  in Continental Center I, about 40% of the tower's office space. By 2016, United had reduced their leasehold at 1600 Smith to just 140,000 SF, and announced they would be leaving at the end of 2017 for new space at 609 E Main.

As of July 2018, the building was 69% leased with over 500,000 square feet available.

Design

Continental Center I includes a blue lighting pattern on the roof that displays the Continental Airlines logo. The light had been kept off for a period before 2010. The Mayor of Houston, Lee P. Brown, said that he supported the ordinance change since it was a promise made by Bob Lanier to the airline in exchange for enticing the company to move its headquarters to Continental Center I. Opponents of the change feared that company logos would become more prevalent in the Downtown Houston skyline.

The elevators were manufactured by Fujitec.

In popular culture 

 1600 Smith Street was featured in a significant portion of the 1990 film RoboCop 2 as the headquarters of the fictional Omni Consumer Products Corporation. Several building locations were utilized as sets for the film, including the exterior, and the main lobby area which was staged as a large executive office.

Gallery

See also

List of tallest buildings in Houston
List of tallest buildings in the United States
Continental Airlines
ExpressJet Airlines

References

External links

 1600 Smith Street
 Continental Center I – Brookfield Properties (Archive)

Skyscraper office buildings in Houston
Airline company headquarters in the United States
Office buildings completed in 1984
Continental Airlines
Brookfield Properties buildings
Buildings and structures in Houston
Downtown Houston